Miss Europe 1962 was the 25th edition of the Miss Europe pageant and the 14th edition under the Mondial Events Organization. It was held at the Casino du Liban in Beirut, Lebanon on 2 June 1962. Maruja García Nicoláu of Spain, was crowned Miss Europe 1962, by outgoing titleholder Ingrun Helgard Möckel of Germany.

Results

Placements

Contestants 

 - Dorli Lazek
 - Jacqueline Oroi
 - Birgitte Heiberg
 - Kim Carlton
 - Kaarina Marita Leskinen
 - Jeanne Rossi
 - Irene Ott
 - Kaiti Papadaki
 - Catharina "Rina" Lodders
 - Guðrun Bjarnadóttir
 - Franca Cattaneo Ferrucci
 - Fernande Kodesch
 - Beate Brevik Johansen
 - Maruja García Nicoláu
 - Brigitta Lundberg
 - Francine Delouille
 - Zeynep Viyal (Zeynep Ziyal)

References

External links 
 

Miss Europe
1962 beauty pageants
1962 in Lebanon